Foot Creek is a stream in the U.S. state of South Dakota.

According to the Federal Writers' Project, Foot Creek derives its name from an obscure settler named Foote.

See also
List of rivers of South Dakota

References

Rivers of Brown County, South Dakota
Rivers of McPherson County, South Dakota
Rivers of South Dakota